Senden is a municipality in the district of Coesfeld, in North Rhine-Westphalia, Germany.

Geography

Geographic location
The municipality of Senden is situated in the east of the district of Coesfeld, approx. 15 km south-west of the city of Münster.

The river Stever and the Dortmund-Ems Canal are partially situated in the municipality of Senden.

Neighbouring municipalities
 City:
 Münster
 Towns:
 Dülmen
 Lüdinghausen
 Municipalities (villages):
 Ascheberg
 Havixbeck
 Nordkirchen
 Nottuln

Division of the municipality
The municipality of Senden consists of 4 villages:
 Bösensell
 Ottmarsbocholt
 Senden
 Venne

Special natural site
Near the village of Venne there is a famous marshland called Venner Moor. This nature reserve is situated near the Dortmund-Ems Canal and consists of some large swamps. Especially in spring and in fall the area shows its beautiful nature.

History
The first historical mentions of the villages of the municipality were as follows:
 Senden in 890
 Ottmarsbocholt in 980
 Bösensell in 1148
 Venne's in 1230

On January 1, 1975 these four formally autonomous municipalities became parts of the present municipality of Senden.

Politics
The major political party is the CDU (19 seats in the municipality council). Other parties in the council are the SPD (8 seats), Green Party (4 seats) and the FDP (3 seats). The mayor is Alfred Holz, who does not belong to a party but who is supported by the CDU and the SPD.

Transport
Near Bösensell there is an exit to the Autobahn A 43.

Two important bus lines serve the municipality. A local bus line connects the villages of Bösensell, Senden and Ottmarsbocholt. A high speed bus line, which connects Münster and Lüdinghausen via the A43 runs through Senden.

There is a small harbour at the Dortmund-Ems Canal.

The village of Bösensell has a railway station at the line between Münster and Essen.

Education
The municipality of Senden has seven schools:
 Bösensell:
 1 primary school
 Ottmarsbocholt:
 1 primary School
 Senden:
 2 primary schools
 1 Hauptschule
 1 Realschule
 1 Gymnasium

References

External links

  
 Website of Ottmarsbocholt 

Coesfeld (district)